Pan Jin-yu (21 July 1914 – 24 October 2010) was the last remaining speaker of the Pazeh language of Taiwan. She was born the fifth of six children in 1914 to Kaxabu parents in Puli. Later, she was adopted by parents who were Pazeh speakers living in Auran village (Taiwanese: Ailan), which is now part of Puli township. She was said to be fully fluent in the language, despite being the only remaining speaker. However, Taiwanese Hokkien was the living language she spoke generally. She taught Pazeh classes to about 200 regular students in Puli, and there were also classes with fewer students in Miaoli and Taichung.

References

External links
 
  
 The secret of Formosan languages (Program clip including exclusive interviews with Pan Jin-yu) 
 The Last Speakers (including Pan Jin-yu photo; Pazih language, Taiwan)

Last known speakers of a language
Taiwanese indigenous peoples
Pan Jin-yu
2010 deaths
People from Nantou County